Ansorge's greenbul (Eurillas ansorgei) or Ansorge's bulbul, is a species of the bulbul family of passerine birds. 
It is found in western and central Africa.
Its natural habitat is subtropical or tropical moist lowland forests.

Taxonomy and systematics
Ansorge's greenbul was originally described in the genus Andropadus and was re-classified to the genus Eurillas in 2010. Alternatively, some authorities classify Ansorge's greenbul in the genus Pycnonotus. Some authorities have considered Ansorge's greenbul as a subspecies of the little grey greenbul. The common name and scientific name commemorate the British explorer and collector William John Ansorge who collected natural history specimens in Africa.

Subspecies
Two subspecies are recognized:
 Ansorge's little grey greenbul (E. a. ansorgei) - (Hartert, 1907): Found from western Guinea to south-western Uganda and eastern  Democratic Republic of Congo
 Kavirondo little grey greenbul (E. a. kavirondensis) - (van Someren, 1920): Originally described as a separate species. Found in western Kenya

References

Ansorge's greenbul
Birds of the African tropical rainforest
Ansorge's greenbul
Taxonomy articles created by Polbot